HM Prison Pentridge was an Australian prison that was first established in 1851 in Coburg, Victoria. The first prisoners arrived in 1851. The prison officially closed on 1 May 1997.

Pentridge was often referred to as the "Bluestone College", "Coburg College" or "College of Knowledge". The grounds were originally landscaped by landscape gardener Hugh Linaker.

The site is currently split into two parts.

The northern part of the prison, referred to as the "Pentridge Coburg" or "Pentridge Piazza" site, is bordered by Champ Street, Pentridge Boulevard, Murray Road and Stockade Avenue. It is currently under development by the developer Shayher Group, who has owned the site since 2013. The southern part of the prison, referred to as the "Pentridge Village" site, is bordered by Pentridge Boulevard, Stockade Avenue, Wardens Walk and Urquhart Street. It is partially owned by the developer Future Estate. D Division is owned privately by Pentridge Cellars Pty Ltd.

Divisions 

The prison was split into many divisions, named using letters of the alphabet.

 A – Short- and long-term prisoners of good behaviour but during the late 1980s, until its closure it became a scene of many monthly bashings, stabbings and bludgeonings.
 B – Long-term prisoners with behaviour problems
 C – Vagabonds and short-term prisoners, where infamous bushranger Ned Kelly was imprisoned (demolished early 1970s)
 D – Remand prisoners
 E – The hospital, later turned into a dormitory division housing short-term prisoners
 F – Remand and short-term
 G – Psychiatric problems
 H – High security, discipline and protection
 J – Young Offenders Group. Later for long-term prisoners with record of good behaviour
Jika Jika – maximum-security risk and for protection, later renamed K Division

Panopticons 

In 2014, archaeological work in the former prison grounds led to the discovery of three rare panopticons (named after Jeremy Bentham's prison design of 1791) located near the A and B Divisions that were built of bluestone in the 1850s. The first uncovered and excavated was to the north of A division. The circular design, with walls coming out from the centre, created wedge shaped 'airing yards' where prisoners would be permitted access for one hour per day without coming into contact with each other. The panopticons fell out of use, due to prison overcrowding, and were largely demolished in the early 1900s. The panopticons were based on the design concepts of British philosopher and social reformer Jeremy Bentham. The footings of the first panopticon that was excavated and uncovered is located to the north of A Division and remains relatively intact. The excavation and uncovering of the other two panopticons next to B Division only revealed the remains of its rubble footings.

Jika Jika high-security unit (K Division) 
Jika Jika, opened in 1980 at a cost of A$7 million, was a 'gaol within a gaol' maximum-security section, designed to house Victoria's hardest and longest-serving prisoners. It was awarded the 'Excellence in Concrete Award' by the Concrete Institute of Australia before being closed, eight years later, amidst controversy after the deaths of five prisoners in 1987.

The design of Jika Jika was based on the idea of six separate units at the end of radiating spines. The unit comprised electronic doors, closed-circuit TV and remote locking, designed to keep staff costs to a minimum and security to a maximum. The furnishings were sparse and prisoners exercised in aviary-like escape-proof yards.

In 1983 four prisoners escaped from 'escape-proof' Jika Jika. When two prison officers were disciplined in relation to the Jika Jika escape, a week-long strike occurred.

1987 Jika Jika prison fire 
Inmates Robert Wright, Jimmy Loughnan, Arthur Gallagher, David McGauley and Ricky Morris from one side of the unit, and convicted Russell Street bomber Craig Minogue and three other inmates on the other side, sealed off their section doors with a tennis net. Mattresses and other bedding were then stacked against the doors and set on fire. Wright, Loughnan, Gallagher, McGauley and Morris died in the blaze, while Minogue and the three others were evacuated and survived.

Prison works 

In 1851, an ad hoc group of structures built by prison labour using local materials existed. None of these structures survived, other than the boundaries of the prison that were established. The second phase of construction, undertaken in the late 1850s and early 1860s, was the construction of Inspector General William Champ's model prison complex, based on British and American precedents.

In 1924, Pentridge replaced the Melbourne Gaol as the main remand and reception prison for the metropolitan area. In 1929, Melbourne Gaol was closed and its prisoners relocated to Pentridge. The Victorian Government confirmed its intention to close Pentridge and replace it with two new male prisons, each accommodating around 600 prisoners, in December 1993. In April 1995, the Office of Corrections ordered that the six main towers at Pentridge be closed, since most of the high-security prisoners from the gaol had been relocated to Barwon as part of the downgrading of Pentridge to a medium-security prison. The prison was finally closed in 1997 and sold by the State Government of Victoria.

Since the site was closed, almost all of the buildings identified as being of no significance in the 1996 Pentridge Conservation Management Plan (1996 CMP) prepared by Allom Lovell & Associates have been demolished with the approval of Heritage Victoria. The remaining heritage buildings and landmarks of significance, including A, B, D, E and H Divisions, B Annexe, Pentridge's iconic entrance, the administration building, the warden's quarters, the rock-breaking yards, the guard towers/posts (or observation posts) and the wall surrounding the site have been retained and will undergo restoration works to ensure their stability and preservation into the future. The site as a whole is also classified as a place of state significance by the National Trust of Australia (Victoria) (National Trust). The National Trust has adopted the levels of significance identified in the 1996 CMP.

Future of the site 

A number of the heritage buildings are protected in the Victorian Heritage Register and will be retained and integrated into a new community precinct a mix of housing types, retail, public open space and open piazza as set out in the Pentridge Coburg Design Guidelines and Masterplan of February 2014 (Pentridge Coburg Masterplan).

This document forms part of the Moreland Planning Scheme and was approved by The Hon. Matthew Guy, the Victorian Minister for Planning, between December 2010 and December 2014. A similar Masterplan exists for the Pentridge Village site (Pentridge Village Masterplan). The National Trust has expressed strong concerns about the nature of these masterplans, which involves building high-density high-rise between the historic divisions.

In 2016, Shayher Group revealed plans for a new "urban village" including up to 20 new buildings with community spaces and landscaped gardens as set out in the Pentridge Coburg Masterplan. Work has been undertaken to restore the roof of A Division, and seven guard towers. The H Division's rock-breaking yards were demolished.

Grave sites 

The grave site of bushranger Ned Kelly formerly lay within the walls of Pentridge Prison while Ronald Ryan's remains have been returned to his family. Kelly was executed by hanging at the Melbourne Gaol in 1880 and his remains moved to Pentridge Prison in 1929, after his skeleton was disturbed on 12 April 1929 by workmen constructing the present Royal Melbourne Institute of Technology (RMIT) building. Peter Norden, former prison chaplain at Pentridge Prison, has campaigned for the site's restoration.

As of 2011, most of the bodies have been exhumed by archaeologists and have either been re-interred in the original cemetery near D Division, are awaiting identification at the Melbourne morgue or have been returned to their families.

In 2011, Ned Kelly's remains were once again exhumed and returned to his surviving descendants for a proper family burial. The identified remains of Kelly did not include most of his skull. DNA testing also established another complete skull believed to be Kelly's was not in fact his.

Executions

Last execution

Ronald Ryan, the last man executed at Pentridge Prison, was also the last man to be executed in Australia.

He was hanged in D Division at 8:00 am on 3 February 1967 after being convicted of shooting dead prison officer George Hodson during an escape from the prison. Later that day, Ryan's body was buried in an unmarked grave within the D Division prison facility.

Notable prisoners 

 Dennis Allen – oldest member of the Pettingill family 
 Garry David – (d. 1993), also known as Garry Webb, responsible for the Community Protection Act 1990
 John Dixon-Jenkins – aka Anti-nuclear Warrior, imprisoned for planting fake bombs as part of a personal endeavour to raise public awareness about the global nuclear threat; authored The Unified Theory of Existence (A Love Story) while in Pentridge (1986).
 Peter Dupas – Australian serial killer
 Keith Faure – convicted of murdering Lewis Caine and Lewis Moran with Evangelos Goussis during the Melbourne gangland killings, and was also the basis for the character of Keithy George in the film Chopper.
 Christopher Dale Flannery – aka Mr Rent-a-Kill, hitman.
 Kevin Albert Joiner – murderer, shot dead trying to escape in 1952
Robert Wrightmurderer, killed a mother and her nine-year-old son in 1979; involved in two escapes including the 1983 Jika Jika escape. Died in the 1987 Jika Jika prison fire. 
 Ned Kelly – murderer and bushranger 
 Julian Knight – murdered 7 people in the Hoddle Street massacre
 Shelton Lea – poet
 Eddie Leonski – U.S. soldier, known as the Brownout Strangler
 Craig 'Slim' Minogue – the Russell Street bomber
 Clarrie O'Shea – a trade unionist, arrested for contempt of court, triggering massive state-wide strike action
 Victor Peirce – a member of the Pettingill family, acquitted of the 1988 Walsh Street police shootings. Killed in 2002.
 Harry Power – a bushranger
 Mark "Chopper" Read – a gang leader and standover man 
James "Jimmy" Loughnanan armed robber; broke both legs jumping from a Pentridge wall in an escape attempt in 1977. Died in the 1987 Jika Jika prison fire.
 Gregory David Roberts – author of Shantaram, escapee of Pentridge who fled to India
 Ronald Ryan – the last person to be executed in Australia
 Frank Penhalluriack – imprisoned in the 1980s due to trading hours activism
 Maxwell Carl Skinner – serial escapee, infamous for commandeering a Coburg tram in one of his escapes.
 William Stanford – a sculptor
 Stan Taylor – an actor and convicted Russell Street bomber
 Squizzy Taylor – a gangster
 John Zarb – the first person to be found guilty of having failed to comply with his call-up notice during the Vietnam War
 Billy Longley – Former Painter and Docker
 Jack Charles – Indigenous actor and community leader
 Ray Mooney – Playwright, rapist
 Noel Tovey – Indigenous actor, choreographer and writer, imprisoned for homosexual acts in 1951 and raped by two of the guards
David McMillana drug smuggler arrested following Operation Aries, a Victoria Police/Federal Police taskforce operation reported to have cost over A$2 million

Timeline 
 1851: HM Prison Pentridge established
 1924: Melbourne Gaol was closed and its prisoners were relocated to Pentridge
 1951: The last woman to be executed in Australia, Jean Lee, is hanged
 1967: The last person to be executed in Australia, Ronald Ryan, is executed at the prison. Between 1842 and 1967, 186 prisoners were executed in Victoria, including 10 at Pentridge Prison.
 1987: Five prisoners die in a fire in the Jika Jika unit during riots over prison conditions. Four inmates survived the fire.
 1997: Pentridge Prison is closed by the Victorian government
 1999: The State Government of Victoria sells Pentridge to developers Luciano Crema and Harry Barbon in partnership with Peter and Leigh Chiavaroli
 2002: Pentridge is split into Pentridge Piazza (also referred to as Pentridge Coburg), controlled by Luciano Crema and Harry Barbon, and Pentridge Village, controlled by Peter and Leigh Chiavaroli
 2007: Luciano Crema and Harry Barbon sell the Pentridge Coburg site to developers Valad Property Group and Abadeen Group
 2009: The Pentridge Coburg Masterplan and Pentridge Village Masterplan are approved by the Victorian Planning Minister following a consultation period
 2013: The Valad Property Group sells the Pentridge Coburg site to developer Shayher Group
 2014: A revision to the Pentridge Coburg Masterplan is approved by the Victorian Planning Minister
 2015: Chiavaroli sells the Pentridge Village site to Future Estate. Shayher Group commences construction of the Horizon apartments at the north-east corner of the Pentridge Coburg site.
 2016: Developers Shayher Group rebrand the Pentridge Coburg site as "Pentridge" and host an Open Day, allowing the community to visit the site. Restoration works occur on the roof of A Division, the guard towers and the rock-breaking yards. The Horizon apartments, the first residential development at the site, are completed.
 2019: Construction of the shopping centre, cinema and Victoria Tower and The Rook apartments begins 
 2020: The redevelopment officially opens to the public.

Escapes
1851 Frank Gardiner – one of fifteen to escape that day
1899 Pierre Douar – suicided after recapture
1901 Mr Sparks – never heard of again
1901 John O'Connor – caught in Sydney two weeks later
1926 J.K. Monson – caught several weeks later in W.A.
1939 George Thomas Howard – caught after two days
1940 K.R. Jones – caught in Sydney two weeks later
1951 Victor Franz – caught next day
1952 Kevin Joiner – shot dead escaping
1952 Maxwell Skinner – pushed off prison wall, broke leg
1957 Willam O'Malley – caught after 15 minutes
1957 John Henry Taylor – caught after 15 minutes
1960 Ralph Wahle - caught after 66 days
1961 Maurice Watson & Gordon Hutchinson – both caught next day
1965 Ronald Ryan & Peter Walker – caught in Sydney 19 days later
1972 Dennis Denehy, Gary Smedley, Alan Mansell & Henry Carlson
1973 Harold Peckman – caught next day
1974 Edward "Jockey" Smith
1974 Robert Hughes & George Carter
1976 John Charles Walker
1977 David Keys
1977 Robert Wrightescaped by hiding underneath rubbish in a garbage truck
1977 James "Jimmy" Loughnan and three others escaped by climbing a rope that had been thrown over the wall. Loughnan broke both his ankles; Father Sean Patrick O'Connell found him lying in his garden that night and took him to Ferntree Gully Hospital where he was identified and arrested.
1977 Peter James Dawson and three others
1980 Gregory David Roberts (at the time known as Gregory Smith) escaped in broad daylight with Trevor Jolly and subsequently went to India after a brief period in New Zealand.
1980 Trevor Jolly
1981 Peter Gibb – captured after a month on the run. Discovered to have been staying in St. Kilda with another escaped criminal.
1982 Harry Richard Nylander
1983 Peter Kray Morgan, Trevor Charles Bradley & Ross Anthony Burleigh
1983 David McGauley & Timothy Nevilleescaped by climbing over the wall during a swimming contest between J Division and A Division; captured after 18 days
1983 Robert Wright, David McGauley, Timothy Neville & David Youlton escaped from Jika Jika.
1987 Dennis Mark Quinn was recaptured in New Zealand 19 days later.

Usage in media
 The front gate showing the "HM Prison Pentridge" sign is featured on the cover of Australian band Airbourne's debut album Runnin' Wild.
 Episode 2, "Homecomings" of the 1976 ABC-TV adaptation of Frank Hardy's novel Power Without Glory features John West picking his brother Frank West up from Pentridge Prison after serving 12 years for rape.
 The 1988 John Hillcoat and Evan English film Ghosts… of the Civil Dead was largely based on events which occurred in Pentridge Prison's infamous Jika Jika maximum-security prison during the lead-up to the 1987 fire.
 The 1994 Australian film Everynight ... Everynight details prison life inside Pentridge's H Division.
 The 2000 Andrew Dominik film Chopper was partially filmed in H Division.
 In the 1997 Australian film The Castle, Wayne was a prisoner of HM Prison Pentridge.
 Rupert Mann's 2017 photo essay, published by Scribe, Pentridge: Voices From The Other Side, contains interviews with, and portraits of, fifteen former inmates and staff who returned to the now-forgotten prison to tell its true and brutal story.
 Pentridge Prison is referenced by name only as the alternative men's prison in Australian soap opera Prisoner.
 Episodes 578 and 579 of Australian soap opera The Sullivans feature the prison.
Pentridge Prison is also depicted in the pilot episode of the TV series Shantaram.

References

External links 

H.M. Melbourne's Pentridge prison, Urban exploration
Transforming an historic icon into an urban hub, Pentridge

1851 establishments in Australia
1997 disestablishments in Australia
Heritage-listed buildings in Melbourne
Maximum security prisons in Australia
Defunct prisons in Melbourne
Buildings and structures in the City of Merri-bek